Martina Velíšková (born 16 April 1971) is a Czech gymnast. She competed in six events at the 1988 Summer Olympics.

References

1971 births
Living people
Czech female artistic gymnasts
Olympic gymnasts of Czechoslovakia
Gymnasts at the 1988 Summer Olympics
Place of birth missing (living people)